Konza mar refer to:

 Konza Prairie Biological Station, Kansas
 Konza, Kenya
 Konza Technopolis